The Russell Octagon House, built in 1859, was a historic octagonal house in Bloomfield, Iowa, United States. It was also known as the Cook House. Once listed on the National Register of Historic Places, it was removed on June 11, 1998. Apparently it had deteriorated due to the poor quality of its original building materials and the lack of maintenance.

References

External links

Houses on the National Register of Historic Places in Iowa
Historic American Buildings Survey in Iowa
Houses in Davis County, Iowa
Octagon houses in Iowa
Houses completed in 1859
National Register of Historic Places in Davis County, Iowa
Former National Register of Historic Places in Iowa